Ichihara may refer to:
 Ichihara (surname), a Japanese surname
 Ichihara, Chiba, a city in Japan
 JEF United Ichihara Chiba, the city's football club
 Ichihara Station, a train station in Kyoto, Japan